Parsęta is a river in the West Pomeranian Voivodeship (Zachodniopomorskie) of north-western Poland, with a length of  and a basin area of . It flows into the Baltic Sea.

Towns:
 Białogard
 Kołobrzeg
 Karlino
Tributaries:
 Bukowa
 Radew
 Mogilica

See also
 Rivers of Poland
 List of rivers of Europe

References

 
Rivers of Poland
Rivers of West Pomeranian Voivodeship